Klint Alexander Kubiak (born February 17, 1987) is an American football coach who is the passing game coordinator for the San Francisco 49ers of the National Football League (NFL). He previously served as the offensive coordinator for the Minnesota Vikings in 2021. 

Kubiak is going into his 9th year of coaching, and has worked four seasons apiece in the NFL and college ranks following his playing career at Colorado State University. He is the son of Gary Kubiak, the former head coach of the Denver Broncos, who lead the team to victory in Super Bowl 50, as well as the Vikings former assistant head coach.

College career
Kubiak attended Colorado State University (CSU), where he played safety for the Colorado State Rams football team from 2005 to 2009. He was named a team captain as a senior and was invited to play in the East-West Shrine Game.

Coaching career

Texas A&M
Kubiak started his coaching career at Texas A&M University as an offensive quality control coach from 2010–2011 and as a graduate assistant and inside receivers coach in 2012. During his three years with the Aggies, Kubiak earned his master's degree in human resource development.

Minnesota Vikings
In 2013, Kubiak was hired by the Minnesota Vikings as an offensive quality control and assistant wide receivers coach under offensive coordinators Bill Musgrave (2013) and Norv Turner (2014).

Kansas
In 2015, Kubiak accepted a position at the University of Kansas to coach the wide receivers.

Denver Broncos

On February 22, 2016, Kubiak was hired by the Denver Broncos as an offensive assistant while his father, Gary Kubiak, was the head coach of the team. During the 2017 season, Kubiak assumed responsibilities as the primary quarterbacks coach for the final six weeks of the regular season after Bill Musgrave was promoted to offensive coordinator.

Minnesota Vikings (second stint)
On January 14, 2019, Kubiak was hired by the Minnesota Vikings as their quarterbacks coach under offensive coordinator Kevin Stefanski and head coach Mike Zimmer. 

On February 8, 2021, Kubiak was promoted to offensive coordinator, replacing his father, Gary Kubiak, following his retirement.

Denver Broncos (second stint)
On February 2, 2022, Kubiak was re-hired by the Denver Broncos as their passing game coordinator and quarterbacks coach under offensive coordinator Justin Outten and head coach Nathaniel Hackett. Following offensive struggles to start the 2022 season, on 20 November 2022, it was announced that Hackett would be relinquishing play calling duties to Kubiak.

Personal life
Klint is the oldest son of former NFL coach Gary Kubiak. His younger brothers Klay is a defensive quality control coach for the San Francisco 49ers and Klein is an area scout for the Dallas Cowboys.

References

External links
 Denver Broncos profile
 Minnesota Vikings profile

1987 births
Living people
American football safeties
Colorado State Rams football players
Denver Broncos coaches
Kansas Jayhawks football coaches
Minnesota Vikings coaches
National Football League offensive coordinators
Players of American football from Houston
Texas A&M Aggies football coaches